The Crisis is an Australian melodrama film directed by W. J. Lincoln. It was inspired by a painting, The Crisis by Frank Dicksee, and is considered a lost film.

Plot
Nellie Owen is happily married to fisherman John, with whom she has a child, until a philanderer, Frank, convinces her that her husband is unfaithful. She runs away to the city with Frank, where she assists him extracting money from the rich in society, but after a while is consumed by guilt and wants to return home. After an argument with Frank, she arrives in time to help nurse her sick child through a serious illness, and is reunited with her forgiving husband.

Cast
Roy Redgrave
George Bryant
Beryl Bryant
Tom Cannam
Kathleen Lindgren

Plot
The Painting was purchased by the Melbourne Art Gallery in 1891.

Reception
The Referee said the "scenic settings... are very fine including some effective seascapes."

References

External links
The Crisis at National Film and Sound Archive 
The Crisis at AustLit
The Crisis at IMDb

Australian black-and-white films
Australian silent feature films
Lost Australian films
1913 films
Australian drama films
1913 drama films
Melodrama films
1913 lost films
Lost drama films
Works based on art
Films directed by W. J. Lincoln
Silent drama films
1910s Australian films
1910s English-language films